Edward Chamberlain (by 1509 – 29 October 1557) was an English politician.

Family
Chamberlain was the second son of Sir Edward Chamberlain, MP. His brothers were the MPs Sir Leonard Chamberlain and Sir Ralph Chamberlain. In 1548, he had married Elizabeth Lawrence, daughter of Mr. Lawrence of Fulwell, Oxfordshire. She was the widow of Sir John Welsborne, who had died April 1548. Elizabeth and Chamberlain had one son, Richard.

Career
He was a Member (MP) of the Parliament of England for Heytesbury in 1545, Buckingham in March 1553 and Mitchell in October 1553.

References

1557 deaths
Year of birth uncertain
English MPs 1545–1547
English MPs 1553 (Edward VI)
English MPs 1553 (Mary I)
Members of the pre-1707 English Parliament for constituencies in Cornwall